The Olivas Adobe in Ventura, California is an adobe structure built in 1837 by Raymundo Olivas on the north bank of the Santa Clara River about a mile from the estuary where it flows into the Santa Barbara Channel.

The land had originally been part of grazing area for the cattle herds of Mission San Buenaventura but was appropriated during the secularization of the missions lands.

Olivas built the adobe home in 1837, and expanded it in 1849 to two stories, making it the only such building in the area. He and his wife and their 21 children lived here until 1899. It later became Max Fleischmann's hunting lodge (of yeast and margarine fame). After his death, his foundation donated the land and the house to the City of Ventura.

The Olivas Adobe is registered as California Historical Landmark #115 and is listed on the National Register of Historic Places in 1979.

In popular culture
The Star Film Company headed by Gaston Méliès shot a silent film in 1913 here called “The Gringo Strikes” which featured a Robin Hood-like character in old Mexico.

See also
 List of Registered Historic Places in Ventura County, California
 City of Ventura Historic Landmarks and Districts
 Ranchos of California
 Spanish missions in California

References

External links

City of Ventura.  Detail Sheet #1
Kirsten Anderberg. "The Olivas Family Adobe in Ventura" (Photos)

Adobe buildings and structures in California
Buildings and structures in Ventura, California
California Historical Landmarks
Historic house museums in California
History of Ventura County, California
Houses in Ventura County, California
Houses on the National Register of Historic Places in California
National Register of Historic Places in Ventura, California
Mexican California
Museums in Ventura County, California
Open-air museums in California
1841 establishments in Alta California